The following buildings in Bartow were added to the National Register of Historic Places as part of the Bartow Multiple Property Submission (or MPS).

References

External links
 Polk County listings at National Register of Historic Places
 Polk County listings at Florida's Office of Cultural and Historical Programs

Bartow Buildings
Buildings and structures in Bartow, Florida
1993 establishments in Florida